"Private Universe" is a 1993 song by rock group Crowded House from the group's fourth studio album Together Alone. It was released as a single in Australia in October 1994. The single peaked at #46 on the Australian ARIA singles chart in January 1995, and spent 14 weeks in the top 100.

"Private Universe" is the only song to be featured on all of Crowded House's compilation and live albums (including the greatest hits compilation Recurring Dream, an acoustic mix version on the rarities compilation Afterglow, and on both live albums Special Edition Live Album and Farewell to the World).

Reception
Junkee said, "the song may be among the quietest in their discography — which, rather than being easy to ignore, only makes you want to listen more intently. Doing so will lead you to its wafting keyboards, hypnotic tablas and Finn embracing these fleeting moments of unity while he’s able."

Track listings

Standard CD single
Live tracks recorded at The Boathouse, Norfolk, Virginia, 11 April 1994. "I am In Love" previously unreleased in Australia (later featured on Afterglow). Single sleeve contains complete lyrics to Together Alone which, notably, the album does not contain.
"Private Universe (Radio Edit) - 3:59
"Nails In My Feet (Live) - 4:38
"In My Command (Live) - 3:40
"Whispers and Moans (Live) - 4:40
"I Am In Love - 4:36

US Jukebox 7" vinyl
Pressed onto orange vinyl.
"Private Universe" - 3:59
"Black & White Boy" - 4:00

Charts

Notes

Crowded House songs
1994 singles
Songs written by Neil Finn
1993 songs
Capitol Records singles